Niki Tobi, CON (July 14, 1940 – June 19, 2016) was an Associate Justice of the Supreme Court of Nigeria. Tobi was born in Esanma, Bomadi LGA in what is now Delta State. Prior to his career in the bench, he was the dean of Faculty of Law and deputy vice-chancellor (academic services), University of Maiduguri. He was appointed to the Supreme Court in 2002.

He was known for his legal erudition and wide knowledge of legal principles. He died on June 19, 2016.

References

2016 deaths
1940 births
Supreme Court of Nigeria justices
People from Delta State